Mal-e Mahmud or Mal Mahmud or Mal Mahmood may refer to:
 Mal-e Mahmud, Bushehr
 Mal-e Mahmud, Fars